The Italian Army ranks are the ranks used by the Italian Army and are worn on epaulettes of shirts. The Army of Italy contains levels of ranks showing both their officers' status and seniority as dedicated members of the Italian militia. Although altered throughout history, the current ranks stand as the lowest rank being "soldato semplice" and the highest rank being "generale". There are a total of 32 ranks within 7 categories. These categories include: temporary service volunteers, permanent service volunteers, sergeants, marshals (NCOs), junior officers, senior officers, and generals.

In order to clearly show an officer's rank as a form of identification and authority, insignia patches are worn by all members of the Italian army. Insignia patches are a sort of label worn on the epaulets of officers that sport different markings, such as stripes and stars, to show how highly ranked an individual is. These patches display a soldier's rank and position to their fellow officers as well as their identity on the battlefield. In each ranking category of officer, there is a trend in the symbols shown on their insignia patches. Each rank an individual rises he gains more detailed and recognizable symbols, these new symbols are most often an additional star or stripe added per higher rank achieved.

Current ranks 
The chart below represents the Italian Army rank insignia used on the slip-on of winter service uniforms. The color of the uniforms is khaki.

Officers who are assigned to a position acting in a higher rank than their own wear the insignia of the higher rank but the highest star of the insignia is trimmed in red enamel. Similarly, an officer temporarily assigned to a position attaining a higher rank in the absence of the incumbent officer, wear the star in bronze colour.

As can be seen, the Italian rank system has a large number of junior NCO ranks. Several ranks (which are variations on corporal) have a "chosen" version of the rank, "chosen" having the same sense of "leading", as in the historic British Army appointment of "chosen man" (now called lance-corporal).

Officers

Enlisted

Enlisted ranks introduced in 2018

History 
Enlisted insignia saw no significant changes until 1973 when the chevrons were moved from the sleeve to the shoulder board. In 1997 the new ranks from 1°CM to CMCS were created for permanent service enlisted personnel, and the new insignia were created. in the same year, the rank of C.le Sc. was created as top rank for conscript personnel with corresponing shoulder board insignia.

Current usage 
The ranks up to  may be attained by temporary service personnel. Higher ranks may only be attained by permanent service personnel. Sergeants generally have team command tasks, and are appointed in the rank only after several months in a training course.

 /Fan.                (Infantryman)
 /Alp.               (Mountain infantryman)
 /Bers.         (Marksman, Rifleman)
 /Par.        (Parachutist)
 /Gra.           (Grenadier)
 /Lag.             (Lagoon infantryman)
 /Art.           (Artilleryman, Gunner)
 /Trs.        (Signaller)
 /Asa. (Medic)
 /Cav.            (Cavalryman)
 /Lanc.            (Lancer)
 /Dra.              (Dragoon)
 /Cr.              (Tanker)
 /Aut.              (Driver)
 /Gnr.              (Pioneer, Sapper)
 /Guast.         (Combat Sapper)
 /Inc.            (Special Forces Operator)

History 

Italian Army officers used to wear the ranks on the sleeve, like naval officers. Since 1946, insignia were changed in order to align with NATO regulations. In 1973 the system had the following slight change: the wreath was added to the stars for general officers, instead of the silver shoulder board; the civic crown was added to the stars for field officers, instead of a gold band on the edge of the epaulette or shoulder strap; the stars began to be placed near the edge of the epaulette instead of in the center. These changes were mostly intended to make insignia more easily recognizable on the field uniform.

Timeline of change

References 

Military ranks of Italy
Italian Army